"Mind Your Manners" is a song by the American rock band Pearl Jam. It was released on July 11, 2013 as a digital download as the lead single from their tenth studio album Lightning Bolt. Writing for The Globe and Mail, Brad Wheeler said the song was "lean, swift and punishing". Pearl Jam guitarist Mike McCready said "It's my attempt to try to make a really hard edge-type Dead Kennedys-sounding song". Singer Eddie Vedder's lyrics criticize organized religion, which Vedder considers hypocritical for their intolerance and "so many of the things which have come out of those organizations– like the abuse of children and then its cover-up."

The song was played live for the first time at their show in London, Ontario, Canada, on July 16, 2013. The video for the song directed by Danny Clinch was released on August 23, 2013. Bassist Jeff Ament brought fellow Missoula, Montana resident Andy Smetanka to do the animation for the video.

Charts

Weekly charts

Year-end charts

Release history

References

External links

2013 singles
2013 songs
Pearl Jam songs
American punk rock songs
Song recordings produced by Brendan O'Brien (record producer)
Monkeywrench Records singles
Songs critical of religion
Songs written by Eddie Vedder
Songs written by Mike McCready